Käthe Grasegger, later Deuschl (19 June 1917 – 28 August 2001) was a German alpine skier who competed in the 1936 Winter Olympics.

She was born in Partenkirchen.

In 1936 she won the silver medal in the alpine skiing combined event.

External links
 Profile
 Käthe Grasegger's profile at Sport's Reference.com

1917 births
2001 deaths
German female alpine skiers
Olympic alpine skiers of Germany
Sportspeople from Garmisch-Partenkirchen
Alpine skiers at the 1936 Winter Olympics
Olympic silver medalists for Germany
Olympic medalists in alpine skiing
Medalists at the 1936 Winter Olympics
20th-century German women